K. R. Seetharama Sastry popularly known as Ku. Ra. Seetharama Sastry or simply Ku. Ra. Si was an Indian actor, writer, lyricist and director in Kannada film industry. After a career in theatre, Sastry's career in films was those of an actor, director, producer, screenwriter, lyricist and an occasional composer. He is considered one of the most influential personalities in the history of Kannada cinema.

Sastry began his film career as an actor in the mythological film, Rajasuya Yaaga (1937). After a brief stint as an actor, he turned into director, lyricist, writer and music composer for the film Mahakavi Kalidasa (1955) which emerged as a biggest commercial and critical success of the year. The film won the President's silver medal for Best feature film for the year.

Ku.Raa.See. was offered the lead role of the 1954 movie Bedara Kannappa by Gubbi Veeranna. However, he rejected it owing to the opportunity he got to work in the direction department of Shaw Brothers Studio, Hong Kong. The role was subsequently played by Rajkumar who went on to be the matinee idol of Kannada cinema.

Apart from Kannada language, Sastry directed 2 movies in Malay language: Kuraana Kaav and Iman (1954) - both of which were selected for the international film festival of Japan - thereby making him the first director from Karnataka whose movies were exhibited in an international platform. He also won international award for his direction.

Early life
Seetharama Sastry hailed from the Mysore Kingdom and was very active in theater during his early age. He found tutelage under Gubbi Veeranna, who is considered the pioneer of Kannada cinema. All his initial movies as an actor was directed by Veeranna.

Filmography

Awards
 1955 - 3rd National Film Awards - Certificate of Merit - Mahakavi Kalidasa

References

External links
 

Kannada film producers
Kannada film directors
Kannada-language lyricists
Male actors from Mysore
Kannada screenwriters
Male actors in Kannada cinema
Indian male film actors
20th-century Indian film directors
Film producers from Karnataka
Film directors from Karnataka
Businesspeople from Mysore
20th-century Indian male actors
20th-century Indian dramatists and playwrights
Writers from Mysore
Musicians from Mysore
20th-century Indian composers
Kannada film score composers
Screenwriters from Karnataka
1922 births
1977 deaths